Breitenberger is a surname. Notable people with the surname include:

Edward Breitenberger, also known as Edd Byrnes, (1932–2020), American actor
Gerhard Breitenberger (disambiguation)
Gerhard Breitenberger (footballer, born 1954), Austrian footballer
Gerhard Breitenberger (footballer, born 1979), Austrian footballer